Amapola Flyg is a passenger and cargo airline based in Stockholm, Sweden. It operates freight services on behalf of the Swedish Post Office, Jetpak and MiniLiner from Maastricht Aachen Airport and its main base at Stockholm-Arlanda Airport.

History 
The airline was established and started operations in 2004 to take over postal services previously operated by Falcon Air. It is wholly owned by Salenia (a Swedish investment company) and has some 50 employees.

On July 1, 2018, Amapola Flyg began passenger air traffic with regional routes in Sweden. In April 2021, the airline started flights in Finland from Helsinki-Vantaa Airport to Joensuu, on behalf of the Finnish State traffic authority Traficom. The airline operated the Dublin to Donegal PSO (Public Service Obligation) service from July 2021 to February 2022, following the collapse of the Irish Stobart Air.

Destinations 
This is a list of destinations operated by Amapola Flyg (passenger flights): Amapola Flyg works together with the Swedish airline Svenska Direktflyg when booking, through the website which flights can be booked. The airline is not part of major booking systems, so flights can't be booked through major travel agent sites, and transfer from other airlines must be done through separate tickets and new checkin.

Fleet 

As of June 2022, the Amapola Flyg fleet consists of the following aircraft:

References

External links 

 
 Amapola Flyg Fleet
 MiniLiner
 JETPAK

Airlines of Sweden
Cargo airlines
Airlines established in 2004
Swedish companies established in 2004
Companies based in Stockholm County